Anker Rogstad (8 January 1925 – 5 October 1994) was a Norwegian convicted safecracker who spent eight years in prison for his crimes, and later a celebrated crime writer. He started writing during imprisonment, and made his literary debut in 1956 with the crime novel Etterlyst. He was awarded the Riverton Prize in 1974 for the novel Lansen.

Select bibliography
Etterlyst (1956)
Jurister i kasjotten (1969)
Lansen (1974)
Hevnen (1975)
Ærens pris (1986)

References

1925 births
1994 deaths
20th-century Norwegian novelists
Norwegian crime writers
Writers from Oslo
Norwegian prisoners and detainees
Prisoners and detainees of Norway